Pillar Falls is a waterfall near Twin Falls, Idaho. Several basalt pillars divide the Snake River into multiple channels, through which the river drops about 20 feet (6 m).

Gallery

See also
 List of waterfalls in Idaho

Notes

Landforms of Twin Falls County, Idaho
Snake River
Waterfalls of Idaho
Twin Falls, Idaho
Tourist attractions in Twin Falls County, Idaho
Cascade waterfalls